Eucalyptus victoriana is a species of small to medium-sized tree that is endemic to the Grampians in Victoria, Australia. It has rough, stringy bark on part of the trunk, egg-shaped to lance-shaped adult leaves, flower buds in groups of seven to eleven, white flowers and cup-shaped to hemispherical fruit.

Description
It has rough, stringy bark on part of the trunk, smooth pale grey and creamy white above.

Taxonomy and naming
Eucalyptus victoriana was first formally described in 1993 by Pauline Y. Ladiges and Trevor Paul Whiffin in Australian Systematic Botany from specimens collected on Mount Thackeray in the Grampians National Park in 1987. The specific epithet (victoriana) is a reference to the state of Victoria.

Distribution
This eucalypt has a restricted in the Grampians area.

See also
 List of Eucalyptus species

References

Flora of Victoria (Australia)
Trees of Australia
victoriana
Myrtales of Australia
Grampians (national park)
Plants described in 1993